Pieter de Marees was a Dutch trader and explorer who is notable for writing an extensive report about his trip to the Gold Coast in 1602. This Beschrijvinghe ende historische verhael van het Gout Koninckrijck van Gunea anders de Gout-custe de Mina genaemt, liggende in het deel van Africa was the first thorough description of this part of Africa in the Dutch language, and greatly increased interest in this region in the Dutch Republic. It was translated into German, English, and Latin, and remained the most important document on the Gold Coast until it was surpassed by Willem Bosman's Nauwkeurige beschrijving van de Guinese Goud- Tand- en Slavekust (1703).

References

 P.D.M. [Pieter de Marees]: Beschrijvinghe ende historische verhael vant gout koninckrijck van Guinea, Michiel Colijn: Amsterdam 1617 (original edition published by Cornelis Claesz, Amsterdam 1602) 
 Pieter de Marees: Beschryvinge ende Historische Verhael van het Gout Koninckrijck van Gunea (1602), hg. v. Samuel Pierre L’Honoré Naber (Werken uitgegeven door de Linschoten Vereeniging, vol. 5), ’s-Gravenhage 1912.
 Pieter de Marees: Description and Historical account of the Gold Kingdom of Guinea (1602), transl. and ed. by Albert van Dantzig/Adam Jones (Fontes Historiae Africanae, varia, vol. 5), Oxford 1987.
 Regula Iselin: Reading Pictures. On the Value of the Copperplates in the »Beschryvinghe « of Pieter de Marees (1602) as Source Material for Ethnohistorical Research, in: History in Africa 21 (1994), pp. 147–170.
 Christina Brauner: Das Verschwinden des Augenzeugen. Transformationen von Text und Autorschaftskonzeption in der deutschen Übersetzung des Guinea-Reiseberichts von Pieter de Marees (1602) und seiner Rezeption, in: Bettina Noak (ed.), Auctoritas und Wissenstransfer in der frühneuzeitlichen niederländischsprachigen Literatur 1500-1800, Göttingen 2014, pp. 19–60.

17th-century Dutch explorers
Explorers of Africa
16th-century births
17th-century deaths
Dutch Gold Coast people